This list consists of college football players who have been elected to the College Football Hall of Fame.

L

M

N

O

P

R

S

T

U

V

W

Y

Z

References

See also
 List of College Football Hall of Fame inductees (players, A–K)
 List of College Football Hall of Fame inductees (coaches)

 List of College Football Hall of Fame inductees (players, L-Z)
Hall of Fame inductees (players, L-Z)